A Sawfish is a large, endangered cartilaginous fish with a saw-shaped nose.

Sawfish may also refer to:

 Sawfish (window manager), a window manager for Unix systems running X
 Sawfish harvester, a submersible robot equipped with a chainsaw for harvesting underwater trees